According to the Plan is a 2007 German film directed by Franziska Meletzky.

Cast 
 Dagmar Manzel - Anne
 Corinna Harfouch - Iris
  - Marianne
 Christine Schorn - Silvia
 Robert Gallinowski - Martin
 Otto Mellies - Wolf
 Simone Kabst - Britta
 Matthias Brenner - Fotograf Micky

References

External links 

2007 films
German comedy-drama films
2000s German-language films
2000s German films